The following highways are numbered 774:

United States